1001 Danish Delights is a 1972 Danish comedy film directed by Sven Methling and starring Dirch Passer.

Cast 
 Dirch Passer – Grev Axel von Hasteen
 Axel Strøbye – Baron Joachim von Hasteen
 Poul Bundgaard – Peter, butler
 Clara Pontoppidan – Enkegrevinde von Hasteen
 Lone Hertz – Kriminalassistent Marie Hansen
 Judy Gringer – Sonja,  Julie
 Gunnar Lemvigh – Flammevold
  – Flammevolds nevø
 Agnete Wahl – Helene
 Denise Lee Dann – Denise
 Susanne Saabye – Cecilie
 Erik Holmey – Ung mand til hest
 Merete Kjellow – Ingrid
  – Margaretha
 Inta Briedis – Suzette
 Lisbeth Westergaard – Elise
  – Lancierdansende pige
  – 
 Conni Muchitsch – Birgitte
 Dorte Holst – Benedicte
 Ninette Følsgaard – Jeanette
 Kai Holm – Chauffør Johansen
  – Kriminalassistent Hansen
  – Bryllupsgæst
 Sigrid Horne-Rasmussen – Fru Thomsen
  – Georg Thomsen

References

External links 
 
 
 

1972 films
1972 comedy films
Danish comedy films
1970s Danish-language films
Films directed by Sven Methling